is the cuisine of the Okinawa Prefecture of Japan. Due to differences in culture, historical contact between other regions, climate, vegetables and other ingredients, Okinawan cuisine differs from mainland Japanese cuisine.

History
Okinawan cuisine incorporates influences from Chinese cuisine and Southeast Asian cuisine due to its long history of trade. The sweet potato, introduced in Okinawa in 1605, became a staple food in Okinawa from then until the beginning of the 20th century. An article about Okinawan food written by Kikkoman states that Goya (bitter melon) and Nabera (luffa or towel gourd) were "likely" introduced to Okinawa from Southeast Asia. Since Ryukyu had served as a tributary state to China, Ryukyuan cooks traveled to Fujian Province to learn how to cook Chinese food; Chinese influence seeped into Okinawa in that manner. Pork, which plays an important role in the Okinawan diet, diffused in the seventeenth century in response to demands from Chinese ambassadors, who preferred it to beef. The trade with Siam (Thailand) also introduced the use of Thai Indica Rice which is used for the distillation of awamori from the 15th century. After the lord of the Satsuma Domain invaded the Ryukyus, Okinawan cooks traveled to Japan to study Japanese cuisine, causing that influence to seep into Okinawan cuisine.

Okinawa was administered by the United States after World War II, during which time various canned foods were popularized. American hamburger shops entered into the Okinawa market earlier than on the mainland. It was during this period that Okinawans became familiar with Americanized food culture. The cuisine has evolved in modern times, especially because of the American military presence on Okinawa since the end of World War II.

Character

Besides vegetables and fruits, the influences of southern and southeastern Asia are evident in Okinawan cuisine in its use of herbs and spices, such as turmeric, used in Okinawa more often than in mainland Japan, but less frequently than other tropical island cuisines. Okinawan cuisine's condiments consist mainly of salt, miso, bonito flakes (katsuobushi) or kombu. Compared to mainland diets, Okinawan dishes do not use as many kinds of mushroom. 

Despite being surrounded by the sea, Okinawans eat relatively little seafood compared to other maritime cultures. Fish and other seafood products were traditionally difficult to preserve in the high temperatures of the Okinawan islands. Additionally, the islands are surrounded by relatively few fish species. The primary preparations of fish are pickling in salt (shio-zuke), dried, grilled, simmered in soy sauce (nitsuke), and as kamaboko, a processed seafood product typically made from white fish. Sashimi is served in Okinawa, but is limited by the inability to retain freshness due to high temperatures on the islands. Sashimi, unlike on the main islands of Japan, is not part of a full course meal.

Okinawans make salad, soup, or tempura using seaweeds like
mozuku and hijiki. Okinawan cuisine frequently uses kombu (kelp), not only in making soup stock, but also in preparing braised dishes, stir fried dishes and so on. Although it is not cultivated in the region, Okinawa is one of the largest consumers of kombu in Japan. 

Okinawan staple foods are traditionally potatoes, such as sweet potato or taro root, but they are substituted to rice or wheat flour, then Okinawans developed original dishes such as taco rice.

After the end of the occupation, they still have original food cultures, and Americanized foods are frequently eaten in their diets. But, Okinawan people do not consume dairy foods so much, such as milk and cheese. Bread is not so popular as a staple food.

Traditional vs modern

The vast majority of calories consumed from traditional Okinawan cuisine (more than 60 percent) is from the Okinawan sweet potato. The traditional Okinawan cuisine is a high-carbohydrate diet of about 80% carbohydrates. Traditional Okinawan cuisine consists of an abundance of green and yellow vegetables, bitter melon and various soy products. The high legume content from traditional Okinawan cuisine mainly originates from soybean-based products such as tofu.

Fish only makes up a very small part of traditional Okinawan cuisine, as little as 1% compared to 90% plant-based foods. Less than 1% of the traditional Okinawan cuisine is meat, dairy and eggs. The traditional Okinawan cuisine contains three servings of fish a week on average, seven daily servings of vegetables and two servings of tofu. Pork is eaten in traditional Okinawan cuisine but only in small amounts.

Following World War II, Western influences changed the food habits of Okinawan cuisine. Milk, meat, egg and grain intake greatly increased. According to Dan Buettner:

Okinawans doubled their rice consumption, and bread, virtually unknown before, also crept in. Milk consumption increased; meat, eggs, and poultry consumption increased more than seven-fold. Between 1949 and 1972 Okinawans’ daily intake increased by 400 calories. They were consuming more than 200 calories per day more than they needed — like Americans. Cancers of the lung, breast, and colon almost doubled.As a result of increasing illness, there is a movement to teach younger generations the benefits of the traditional Okinawan diet, one that includes a wider variety of vegetables, fermented food and a more balanced intake of meat, such as the Taste of Okinawa cooking school.  Additionally, organic and vegetarian cuisine is becoming more popular, showcased by Ukishima Garden.

Okinawan cuisine is also known for the way in which every part of the pig is utilised, minimising waste.

Ingredients
 Meat and meat products
 Pork
 Soki
 Beef
 Goat
 Fish
 Abasu (porcupinefish)
 Gurukun (double-lined fusilier)
 Soreru (silver-stripe round herring)
 Fruit
 Pineapples
 Papayas
 Mangoes
 Passion fruit
 Guavas
 Citrus fruit
 Vegetables
 Cabbage
 Goya/bitter melon
 Hechima/Luffa
 Shikuwasa
 Yams
 Taro root
 Seaweed
 Garlic
 Onions
 Tomato
 Salad leaves
 Bean products
Aomame
Tofu
 Grains and grain products
 White rice
 Brown rice
 Seitan

Common Okinawan dishes

Main dishes
 Gōyā chanpurū
 Jūshī
 Okinawa soba
 Rafute (Shoyu pork)
 Taco rice
 Minudaru (steamed pork)

Side dishes
 Mimigā (ミミガー) (pig's ear)
 Umi-budō
 Hirayachi
 Tofuyo dish

Alcoholic beverages
 Awamori
 Orion beer

Sweets
 Beniimo (紅芋)
 Chinsuko
 Fuchagi (mochi with sweet beans)
 Jīmami dōfu (peanut-tofu squares)
 Sata andagi
 Muchi
 Okinawan brown sugar

References

 
Japanese cuisine